() is the Vietnamese Catholic term for reciting a prayer or sacred text. In communal worship settings,  is characterized by cantillation, or the ritual chanting of prayers and responses. To Westerners, this form of prayer can be mistaken for song.

Usage 
Within the worldwide Roman Catholic Church, Vietnamese liturgical practise is distinct in its extensive use of cantillation: all prayers and responses during the Mass are either sung or chanted, but never spoken. Thus, the Lord's Prayer is recited differently during the Mass than in a private setting. Gregorian chant is not used in a Vietnamese-language Mass; it is entirely omitted from Vietnamese translations of the Roman Missal and Order of Mass.

It is suspected that cantillation in Lao and Hmong Catholic liturgies is due to Vietnamese influence. Cantillation is far from universal among tonal languages, but Fuzhou Catholics in Fujian have a similar practise.

Structure
Vietnamese cantillation is neither composed nor improvised; it follows a formula in which each of the Vietnamese language's six tones corresponds to a specific note or sequence. Depending on the diocese, tones are organized along a scale of two or three notes. The  and  tones are vocalized as a melisma from a lower note to a higher note. For example:

Parishes in the former West Tonkin diocese use the three-note scale of fa-sol-la, so the incipit of the Hail Mary is rendered:

See also
Buddhist chant

References

External links
Vietnamese Chanting – sample of common Vietnamese Catholic liturgical chants by Oregon Catholic Press
 Việc Hát Thánh Vịnh Đáp Ca Tiếng Việt Nam

Vietnamese language
Catholic music
Christian liturgical music
Christian chants
Catholic Church in Vietnam
Vietnamese words and phrases
Catholic terminology